The 2023 London Marathon is scheduled to be the 43rd running of the annual London Marathon on 23 April 2023. It will be the first time since 2019 that the event will be run in the spring, as the previous three races were run in autumn due to the COVID-19 pandemic.

Background

In August 2021, race organisers confirmed that the 2023 would take place on 23 April; the 2020, 2021 and 2022 events were all held in autumn due to the COVID-19 pandemic. The prize money for the winners of the wheelchair races will be increased by $10,000 to $45,000, with total prize money for each wheelchair event increased from $199,500 to $253,500.

For the first time, competitors in the mass participation event could register as non-binary. There will be a virtual marathon held on the same date as the in person event. In the United Kingdom, the races will be broadcast on BBC One.

Course 

The London Marathon is run over a mainly flat course, starting in Blackheath. The course begins at three separate points and they converge just before  into the race. At just after  into the race, the runners reach the 19th-century clipper Cutty Sark docked in Greenwich and at about halfway into the race, the runners cross Tower Bridge before heading east into Shadwell and Canary Wharf. After winding through Canary Wharf, the route returns through Shadwell on the other side of the road to which it entered before passing through Tower Hill. The runners enter the underpass in Blackfriars before running along the Thames Embankment, past Westminster and onto Birdcage Walk. The course then runs parallel to St James's Park before turning onto The Mall and finishing in front of Buckingham Palace.

Competitors

The elite men's race is scheduled to feature four of the fastest five competitors in history: Kenenisa Bekele, Kelvin Kiptum, Birhanu Legese and Mosinet Geremew. Bekele has won multiple Olympic medals and Kiptum recorded the fastest marathon debut ever at the 2022 Valencia Marathon. 2022 winner Amos Kipruto is also scheduled to return in 2023. Other scheduled competitors include Tamirat Tola, who won the marathon event at the 2022 World Athletics Championships, Geoffrey Kamworor, who has won two New York City Marathons, Leul Gebresilase, who finished second at the 2022 London Marathon, and Vincent Kipchumba, who finished second in both 2020 and 2021. Briton Mo Farah is set to race in his final London Marathon, and other British athletes scheduled to compete include Weynay Ghebresilasie, the fastest finishing Briton in 2022, and Emile Cairess. World record holder Eliud Kipchoge will not compete in London, as he chose to race the 2023 Boston Marathon instead.

The elite women's race is set to feature five runners with a personal best time under 2:18, and ten runners with a PB under 2:19. Competitors will include world record holder Brigid Kosgei, 2020 Summer Olympics champion Peres Jepchirchir, 2022 winner Yalemzerf Yehualaw and 2022 Berlin Marathon winner Tigist Assefa. Also scheduled to compete are Genzebe Dibaba, the record holder in the 1,500 metres and Almaz Ayana, who won the 10,000 metres event at the 2016 Summer Olympics. Sifan Hassan, who won the 5,000 and 10,000 metres events at the 2020 Olympics is scheduled to make her marathon debut, as is Eilish McColgan, the daughter of 1996 winner Liz McColgan. Elilish McColgan won the 10,000 metres event at the 2022 Commonwealth Games and withdrew from the 2022 event. Other Britons scheduled to compete include Jess Piasecki, Charlotte Purdue and Stephanie Davis.

The men's wheelchair competition will feature Marcel Hug, who has won the previous two events. Other competitors include Daniel Romanchuk, who came second in 2022, and eight-time former winner David Weir in his 24th consecutive London Marathon.

The women's wheelchair event will feature 2022 winner Catherine Debrunner, as well as former winners Manuela Schär, Madison de Rozario, Nikita den Boer and Tatyana McFadden. Also scheduled to compete are Susannah Scaroni, who won the 2022 Chicago Marathon, and Briton Eden Rainbow-Cooper, who came third on marathon debut at the 2022 race.

References

2023
2023 marathons
Marathon
2020s in the City of Westminster
April 2023 sports events in the United Kingdom
Sport in the City of Westminster